100 Deeds for Eddie McDowd is a television sitcom created for Nickelodeon by Steven H. Berman, Mitchel Katlin, and Nat Bernstein. The series ran for three seasons, premiering on October 16, 1999, and airing its final episode on April 21, 2002.

Plot

Eddie McDowd (Jason Dohring) is considered to be a schoolyard bully by his peers. McDowd considers himself very attractive and powerful and so he bullies others without mercy. One day, while bullying a kid after school, he is caught by a kind of mystical man. He tells McDowd that due to his bullying he will be punished for his wrongdoings by living life as a dog, and that in order to be restored as a human, he has to do 100 good deeds for others. Besides The Drifter, the only one who can hear him talk is Justin Taylor, the last kid he bullied. At first, the two are firmly against the idea, but McDowd realizes that he must work alongside Justin and his family to finish his good deeds. Every time Eddie performs a good deed, the Drifter appears with a creatively presented number stating the remaining deeds he has left.  Occasionally, when Eddie misbehaves the Drifter takes away one of his deeds. The story has no ending, as the series was cancelled before a final resolution could be made.

Episodes

Characters

Main
Edward "Eddie" McDowd (played by Jason Dohring as a human and John Allan at 12; played "Rowdy" as a dog; voiced by Seth Green in season 1, and Jason Hervey in seasons 2–3) – Eddie is a 17-year-old bully from the southwest who was turned into an Australian Shepherd/Siberian Husky mix by the Drifter for his wrongdoings and can only be restored to human form if he does 100 good deeds. Besides the Drifter, the only other person who can hear him talk is Justin Taylor (who was the last kid that he bullied). It is explained by the Drifter in a later episode that should this happen, neither Justin nor Eddie's family will outright remember their experiences (though Eddie will still be a better person for it).
Justin Taylor (played by Brandon Gilberstadt) – The last kid Eddie had picked on and the only one who can hear him talk in his dog form. He assists Eddie into doing the good deeds to restore Eddie to human.
Gwen Taylor (played by Morgan Kibby) – Justin's sister
Tori Sloan (played by Melanee Murray) – Foreign exchange student who switched families with Gwen in season 2
Lisa Taylor (played by Catherine MacNeal) – Justin's mother
Doug Taylor (played by William Francis McGuire) – Justin's father

Supporting
Sariffa Chung (played by Brenda Song) – Justin's best friend
The Drifter (played by Richard Moll) – A mystical person who was responsible for casting the spell that transformed Eddie into an Australian Shepherd/Siberian Husky mix and will only change him back if he does 100 good deeds. He describes himself to be the embodiment of love, compassion, and tenderness and can do actions that are able to override and break the laws of nature. The Drifter speaks in rhymes and is able to take the form of different living things. He often appears in different forms to give Eddie advice on how to do good deeds.
Spike Cipriano (played by Danny Tamberelli) 
Flaco (played by Josh Hammond) – Eddie's old bullying buddy who also picks on Justin
Agt. Elizabeth Marcus/Dog Catcher (played by Julie Marcus) 
Caesar – (voiced by David Lander) – A dog that befriends Eddie
Salvatore/Sal (voiced by Joe Piscopo) – A pug that's Eddie's friend and next-door neighbor; Piscopo also portrays Salvatore's owner Mr. Watt.
Gigi (voiced by Alyson Hannigan) – A Pomeranian that Eddie is often smitten with

Cancellation
The series was cancelled in the United States due to declining ratings in the spring of 2002 after only 40 episodes and 60 deeds left.

References

External links

1999 American television series debuts
2002 American television series endings
1999 Canadian television series debuts
2002 Canadian television series endings
1990s American teen sitcoms
1990s American sitcoms
1990s Canadian teen sitcoms
1990s Canadian sitcoms
1990s Nickelodeon original programming
2000s American teen sitcoms
2000s American sitcoms
2000s Canadian teen sitcoms
2000s Canadian sitcoms
2000s Nickelodeon original programming
English-language television shows
Television series about families
Television series about teenagers
Television shows set in Los Angeles
Television shows about dogs